Smithville is a town in McCurtain County, Oklahoma, United States. The population was 77 at the 2020 census, down from 113 at the 2010 census.  Smithville has the distinction of being the wettest spot in Oklahoma ranked by highest annual average precipitation, at 55.71 inches.

Geography
Smithville lies in McCurtain County, just east of U.S. Route 259 on Oklahoma Route 4. The town is among a handful of towns in the southeastern corner of Oklahoma, in an area known as Little Dixie.

Demographics

As of the census of 2010, there were 113 people, 53 households, and 28 families residing in the town. The population density was 111 people per square mile (39/km). There were 65 housing units at an average density of 60 per square mile (23/km). The racial makeup of the town was 58.4% White, 34.5% Native American, and 7.1% from two or more races. Hispanic or Latino of any race were 2.7% of the population.

There were 53 households, out of which 32% included children under the age of 18, 34% were married couples living together, 17% had a female householder with no husband present, and 47% were non-families. Individuals living alone accounted for 47% of households and those individuals 65 years of age or older living alone accounted for 21% of households. The average household size was 2.13 and the average family size was 3.07.

In the town, the population was had a varied spread with 31% under the age of 18, 7% from 18 to 24, 22% from 25 to 44, 25% from 45 to 64, and 15% who were 65 years of age or older. The median age was 32 years.

The median income for a household in the town was $21,136, and the median income for a family was $16,083. The per capita income for the town was $15,674. There were 61.9% of families and 45.2% of the population living below the poverty line.

Notable people
Curtis McDaniel, politician

See also
List of towns in Oklahoma

References

Towns in McCurtain County, Oklahoma
Towns in Oklahoma